The Lézarde is a river of Guadeloupe.  in length, it is one of the most important rivers in Guadeloupe, which flows into the town of Petit-Bourg and into the Caribbean Sea on the east coast of the island. It bears its name from the way it winds between rocks and the rainforest. There are sugarcane plantations in the vicinity.

The river is known for its  waterfall, known in French as Saut de la Lézarde, which lies in Guadeloupe National Park. It is a significant local tourist attraction.

References

Rivers of Guadeloupe
Rivers of France